Richard Guy Parker (born 1956) is a professor of sociomedical sciences and of anthropology, arts and sciences, at the Mailman School of Public Health, Columbia University, where he received an award for teaching excellence in 2004. He serves as director of the university's Center for the Study of Culture, Politics, and Health.

Parker received a bachelor's degree (BA, 1980), a master's degree (MA, 1981), and a doctorate (PhD, 1988) from the University of California.

Parker is editor-in-chief of the public health journal Global Public Health.

Works
  (edited book)
  (edited book)
  (original edition 1991)
 
 
  (edited book)
 
  (Portuguese)
  (edited book)

References

Living people
Columbia University faculty
American anthropologists
1956 births